Sandra Williams is a Conseiller on Sark's Chief Pleas, the island's parliament. She was among the first elected to the reformed legislature in 2008, topped the poll in the 2012 election and was returned unopposed in 2016.

Career 

In the lead up to Sark's first democratic elections for its Chief Pleas, Sir Frederick and Sir David Barclay, the billionaire businessmen who reside on Sark's neighbouring island of Brecqhou, had campaigned against what they called the island's "establishment" who aligned themselves with the feudal Seigneur of Sark. Despite "being identified as ruinous to the island" by the Barclay brothers' newsletter, Williams was among the first people elected to the reformed Chief Pleas in 2008, gaining 253 votes, allowing her to serve for four years. She was appointed Chairwomen of the Tourism Committee. She was re-elected in 2012 and came top of the poll, securing 244 votes (71%); she pledged to continue focusing on tourism and land reform, and attributed her success in the vote to popularity with young people. She was nominated for re-election by Helen Plummer and Zoe Adams in 2016, and was re-elected (unopposed) for another four-year term. She remains Chairwoman of the Tourism Committee as of 2017, and is also Chairwoman of the Harbours and Shipping Committee.

References 

People from Sark
21st-century British women politicians
Living people
Year of birth missing (living people)